Maryna Pestryakova (born 26 January 1972) is a Ukrainian cross-country skier. She competed at the 1998 Winter Olympics and the 2002 Winter Olympics.

References

External links
 

1972 births
Living people
Ukrainian female cross-country skiers
Olympic cross-country skiers of Ukraine
Cross-country skiers at the 1998 Winter Olympics
Cross-country skiers at the 2002 Winter Olympics
People from Tomsk